Edmund Lalrindika (born 24 April 1999) is an Indian professional footballer who plays as a forward for Bengaluru FC.

Career
Born in Lunglei, Mizoram, Lalrindika was announced as part of the Bengaluru reserve side for the 2017–18 season. A month later, Lalrindika was selected to play for the Indian Arrows, an All India Football Federation-owned team that would consist of India under-20 players to give them playing time. He made his professional debut for the side in the Arrow's first match of the season against Chennai City. He started and played 90 minutes as Indian Arrows won 3–0.

International
Lalrindika represented the India under-20 side.

Career statistics

Honours

Club 
Bengaluru FC
Indian Super League: 2018–19

References

1999 births
Living people
People from Aizawl
Indian footballers
AIFF Elite Academy players
Indian Arrows players
Bengaluru FC players
East Bengal Club players
Association football forwards
Footballers from Mizoram
I-League players
India youth international footballers